Unthank End is a hamlet in Cumbria, England.

See also

Listed buildings in Skelton, Cumbria

References

UK Coal Board

Hamlets in Cumbria
Skelton, Cumbria